These are the Canadian number-one country songs of 1988, per the RPM Country Tracks chart.

See also
1988 in music
List of number-one country singles of 1988 (U.S.)

References

External links
 Read about RPM Magazine at the AV Trust
 Search RPM charts here at Library and Archives Canada

1988 in Canadian music
Canada Country
1988